Seven Chances is a 1925 American silent comedy film directed by and starring Buster Keaton, based on the play of the same name by Roi Cooper Megrue, produced in 1916 by David Belasco. Additional cast members include T. Roy Barnes, Snitz Edwards, and Ruth Dwyer. Jean Arthur, a future star, has an uncredited supporting role. The film's opening scenes were shot in early Technicolor.

The film includes Keaton's famous rock avalanche sequence.

Plot
Jimmy Shannon (Buster Keaton) is the junior partner in the brokerage firm of Meekin and Shannon, which is on the brink of financial ruin. A lawyer (whom they dodged, mistakenly believing he was trying to add to their woes) finally manages to inform Jimmy of the terms of his grandfather's will. He will inherit seven million dollars if he is married by 7:00 p.m. on his 27th birthday, which happens to be that same day.

Shannon immediately seeks out his sweetheart, Mary Jones, who readily accepts his proposal. However, when he clumsily explains why they have to get married that day, she breaks up with him.

He returns to the country club to break the news to his partner and the lawyer. Though Jimmy's heart is set on Mary, Meekin persuades him to try proposing to other women to save them both from ruin or even possibly jail. He has Jimmy look in the club's dining room; Jimmy knows seven women there (the chances of the title). Each turns him down. In desperation, Jimmy asks any woman he comes across. Even the hat check girl rejects him. He finally finds one who agrees, but it turns out she is underage when her mother spots her and takes her away.

Meanwhile, Mary's mother persuades her to reconsider. She writes a note agreeing to marry Jimmy and sends the hired hand to deliver it.

Unaware of this, Meekin has his partner's predicament (and potential inheritance) printed in the newspaper, asking would-be brides to go to the Broad Street Church at 5 p.m. Hordes of veiled women descend on the place. When they spot Jimmy (who had fallen asleep on a pew), they begin to fight over him. Then the clergyman appears and announces he believes it all to be a practical joke. Infuriated, the women chase after Jimmy. While hiding, he gets Mary's note. He races to Mary's house, pursued by furious females. Along the way, he accidentally starts an avalanche, which drives away the mob.

When he gets to Mary's home, Meekin shows him his watch; he is minutes too late. Mary still wants to marry him, money or no, but he refuses to let her share his impending disgrace. When he leaves, he sees by the church clock that Meekin's watch is fast. He and Mary wed just in time.

Cast

Production
Joseph Schenck bought the rights to Roi Cooper Megrue's play Seven Chances thinking it might be a good project for Keaton or for Norma, Constance or Natalie Talmadge. It was an enormous hit on Broadway and touring, and Schenck paid stage director John McDermott $25,000 with the promise he would direct the film. Schenck had Keaton make the film instead. Keaton hated the play and called it a sappy farce, but he owed money to Schenck and had to make the film to settle his debt.

Shooting began in January 1925. Keaton intended to finish with a fadeout of him still running from the mob of women, but wished he could think of a better ending. However, the preview audience laughed loudest when Keaton's character accidentally dislodged a rock, which struck two others, sending them tumbling down after the hero. Keaton disliked the film but thought the avalanche scene saved it. He cast Doris Deane as one of the "seven chance" fiancées, as a favor to his friend Roscoe "Fatty" Arbuckle (Deane was Arbuckle's fiancée).

Beale's Cut Stagecoach Pass appears in the film.

Reception

Critical response

The film was another box office success for Keaton, grossing $598,288 domestically.

When released, Mordaunt Hall, the film critic for The New York Times, gave the film a mixed review, and wrote, "After viewing Buster Keaton's latest comedy, Seven Chances, one is justified in assuming; that there is a slump in the fun market...it took the combined efforts of three experienced gag men to turn the stage effort into screen material. The result inclines one's belief in the old adage concerning too many cooks, as although there are quite a number of good twists some of them have been produced in haste. The ideas did not have time to ripen and are therefore put before the audience in a rather sour state."

Film critic Dennis Schwartz liked the film and wrote, "A less ambitious but, nevertheless, hilarious Buster Keaton comedy. It's taken from the play by David Belasco and scripted by a team of writers. This minor film is based on a one-joke premise, but it has one of the greatest ever chase scenes. Keaton proves he's a master at building the comedy until it reaches its absolute breaking point."

Time Out London gave the film a positive review and wrote, "Less ambitious and less concerned with plastic values than the best of Keaton, this is nevertheless a dazzlingly balletic comedy in which Buster has a matter of hours to acquire the wife on which a seven million dollar inheritance depends...From this leisurely start, the film takes off into a fantastically elaborate, gloriously inventive chase sequence, in which Buster escapes the mob of pursuing harridans only to find an escalating avalanche of rocks taking over at his heels as he hurtles downhill. Added only after an initial preview, the rocks make for one of the great Keaton action gags."

Awards
 British Film Institute Awards: Sutherland Trophy - Special Mention, Buster Keaton, 1966

Remakes
The story was reworked several times, notably by the Three Stooges twice in the films Brideless Groom (also written by Clyde Bruckman) and Husbands Beware
, in The Suitor (Le Soupirant), a 1962 French comedy starring Pierre Étaix, and in The Bachelor, a 1999 film starring Chris O'Donnell and Renée Zellweger.

The International Buster Keaton Society recreated the Seven Chances "Bridal Run" in the streets of Muskegon, Michigan at their 2010 convention.

See also
 Buster Keaton filmography
 List of early color feature films
 List of United States comedy films

References

Bibliography

External links

 
 
 
 
 
 Seven Chances at the International Buster Keaton Society

1925 films
1925 romantic comedy films
1920s color films
American romantic comedy films
American silent feature films
American films based on plays
Films about inheritances
Films about weddings
Films directed by Buster Keaton
Films produced by Joseph M. Schenck
Films partially in color
Metro-Goldwyn-Mayer films
Films with screenplays by Jean Havez
Silent films in color
Early color films
1920s American films
Silent romantic comedy films
Silent American comedy films